Anapidae is a family of rather small spiders with 232 described species in 58 genera. It includes the former family Micropholcommatidae as the subfamily Micropholcommatinae, and the former family Holarchaeidae.

They generally live in leaf litter and moss on the floor of rain forest. In some species, such as P. parocula, the pedipalps of the female are reduced to coxal stumps.

Description
Spiders of this family are very small, usually less than two millimeters long, and lack a cribellum. They can have either six or eight eyes, the rear median eyes either reduced or missing. The carapace is modified so that the eyes are raised higher than usual. Color can range from reddish brown to yellowish brown. Both margins of chelicerae have teeth. The legs are short and spineless. The labium has a spur that extends between the chelicerae and can be seen when the chelicerae are spread.

Distribution
Anapidae are found worldwide, particularly in South America, Africa, Asia, Australia and New Zealand. Few genera occur in North America or Europe. Only Comaroma simoni  and the three species of Zangherella are found in Europe; Gertschanapis shantzi and Comaroma mendocino are found in the United States.

Systematics
The family Micropholcommatidae was synonymized with this family by Schütt in 2003 and by Lopa et al. in 2011, a change that has been accepted by the World Spider Catalog. Similarly, the family Holarchaeidae was synonymized by Dimitrov et al. in 2017, and likewise accepted by the World Spider Catalog.

Genera

, the World Spider Catalog accepts the following genera:

Acrobleps Hickman, 1979 — Australia
Algidiella Rix & Harvey, 2010 — New Zealand
Anapis Simon, 1895 — South America, Central America, Mexico, Jamaica
Anapisona Gertsch, 1941 — South America, Central America, Saint Vincent and the Grenadines, Mexico
Austropholcomma Rix & Harvey, 2010 — Australia
Borneanapis Snazell, 2009 — Indonesia
Caledanapis Platnick & Forster, 1989 — New Caledonia
Chasmocephalon O. Pickard-Cambridge, 1889 — Australia
Comaroma Bertkau, 1889 — Asia, United States
Conculus Kishida, 1940 — Papua New Guinea, Asia
Crassanapis Platnick & Forster, 1989 — Chile, Argentina
Crozetulus Hickman, 1939 — Africa
Dippenaaria Wunderlich, 1995 — South Africa
Elanapis Platnick & Forster, 1989 — Chile
Enielkenie Ono, 2007 — Taiwan
Eperiella Rix & Harvey, 2010 — Chile, Australia
Epigastrina Rix & Harvey, 2010 — Australia
Eterosonycha Butler, 1932 — Australia
Forsteriola Brignoli, 1981 — Burundi, Rwanda, Congo
Gaiziapis Miller, Griswold & Yin, 2009 — China
Gertschanapis Platnick & Forster, 1990 — United States
Gigiella Rix & Harvey, 2010 — Australia, Chile
Guiniella Rix & Harvey, 2010 — Papua New Guinea
Hickmanapis Platnick & Forster, 1989 — Australia
Holarchaea Forster, 1955 — Australia, New Zealand
Mandanapis Platnick & Forster, 1989 — New Caledonia
Maxanapis Platnick & Forster, 1989 — Australia
Metanapis Brignoli, 1981 — Africa, Nepal
Micropholcomma Crosby & Bishop, 1927 — Australia
Minanapis Platnick & Forster, 1989 — Chile, China, Argentina
Montanapis Platnick & Forster, 1989 — New Caledonia
Normplatnicka Rix & Harvey, 2010 — Australia, Chile
Nortanapis Platnick & Forster, 1989 — Australia
Novanapis Platnick & Forster, 1989 — New Zealand
Octanapis Platnick & Forster, 1989 — Australia
Olgania Hickman, 1979 — Australia
Paranapis Platnick & Forster, 1989 — New Zealand
Patelliella Rix & Harvey, 2010 — Australia
Pecanapis Platnick & Forster, 1989 — Chile
Pseudanapis Simon, 1905 — Asia, Germany, South America, Africa, Mexico, Central America, Papua New Guinea
Pua Forster, 1959 — New Zealand
Queenslanapis Platnick & Forster, 1989 — Australia
Raveniella Rix & Harvey, 2010 — Australia
Rayforstia Rix & Harvey, 2010 — New Zealand, Australia
Risdonius Hickman, 1939 — Australia
Sheranapis Platnick & Forster, 1989 — Chile
Sinanapis Wunderlich & Song, 1995 — China, Laos, Vietnam
Sofanapis Platnick & Forster, 1989 — Chile
Spinanapis Platnick & Forster, 1989 — Australia
Taliniella Rix & Harvey, 2010 — New Zealand
Taphiassa Simon, 1880 — Australia, New Zealand, Sri Lanka
Tasmanapis Platnick & Forster, 1989 — Australia
Teutoniella Brignoli, 1981 — Chile, Brazil
Tinytrella Rix & Harvey, 2010 — New Zealand
Tricellina Forster & Platnick, 1989 — Chile
Victanapis Platnick & Forster, 1989 — Australia
Zangherella Caporiacco, 1949 — Europe, Algeria, Turkey
Zealanapis Platnick & Forster, 1989 — New Zealand

See also
 List of Anapidae species

References

 
Araneomorphae families
Cosmopolitan spiders